Johann Joachim Kändler (June 15, 1706 – May 18, 1775) was a German sculptor who became the most important modeller of the Meissen porcelain manufactury, and arguably of all European porcelain.  He worked at Meissen for over 40 years, from 1731 until his death in 1775.

Meissen pieces of all sorts were normally made with moulds, whose designs Kändler mostly created, supervising the production of the moulds, and checking the quality of the many examples cast.  He was often not involved with their painting, which can vary between examples.

In addition to his work as a modeller, Kändler also came to serve in other roles at Meissen. First as chief of sculptural shaping, later as arcanist, he led the state porcelain manufactury through the restless period of the Seven Years' War and kept production going against the odds.

Life
Kändler was born in Fischbach near Arnsdorf, Germany, as the son of a pastor. He received a classical education and developed an excellent knowledge of Greco-Roman mythology. This knowledge, great skill with his hands and an exceptional gift for observation laid the foundations for Kändler's later career, which would lead him to the court of Prussian King Frederick the Great. The profits of his porcelain work rose in tandem with his social status. Yet at the end of his life, although he owned several properties and his own vineyard, he left behind large debts.

Work
Kändler's professional life began as an apprentice under the important Dresden court sculptor and altar carver Johann Benjamin Thomae (1682–1751). Already at this time he showed much skill, which led to him being given important tasks. His talent did not remain unnoticed and on 22 June 1731 at the age of 25, he was appointed court sculptor by Augustus II and installed as a modeller at the Meissen porcelain manufactory. There he became assistant to Johann Jacob Kirchner, and succeeded him as "modelmaster" in 1733 when Kirchner resigned. His early porcelain animal groups combine a forceful impression of nature with the influence of Dresden sculpture. Later, Kändler was in charge of sculptural shaping and finally became an "arcanist", admitted to the secrets of the formula for porcelain. The summit of his career in official terms was his appointment as Court Commissioner in 1749.

The fame of the Meissen factory was based on the porcelain completed under Kändler's technical and aesthetic direction. In the Swan Service for his Director, Heinrich von Brühl, also the dictatorial First Minister, he developed the small figural scenes which enrich the table service. In its elegant flourish and easy charm, his work shows the heavy influence of rococo.

The works which he produced at Meissen, substantially changed the porcelain industry. His early sculptures, which primarily drew motifs from the natural world, were celebrated for their accuracy and elegance, which contrasted with most work in their pathos. His bird sculptures are especially noteworthy, such as jays with squirrels and stag beetles, orioles, and woodpeckers with cockchafers. Other animal sculptures included one of Clara the rhinoceros. The "Swan Service" created for von Brühl, which is today considered a masterpiece of porcelain art, marked his turn to small decorative figures. Later, as Kändler became increasingly involved in court life, he took inspiration from the very popular form of theatre, commedia dell'arte. Together with his co-workers, he created entire groups of small accessories and figurines, which took the romantic shepherd imagery of rococo and infused it with the life of Commedia dell'arte characters. These figures, especially the Harlequins, give a more evocative sense of this form of theatre than most illustrations.

Out of the over a thousand different items, the "Monkey Band" (or orchestra) created in 1753, which Kändler wished to be seen as a metaphorical rejection of any kind of compulsion, stands out. With this homage to the Enlightenment ideal of the free and rational human, he tapped into the contemporary zeitgeist and created a timeless masterpiece of European porcelain art. To this day, the monkey orchestra has lost none of its popularity and it is still often reproduced. Kändler also produced a model of Augustus III of Poland on a horse which was intended to be a life size statue for the city. It was never carried through though.

There is an all white figure of the Triumph of Amphitrite in the Berlin Museum that is the only known figure Kändler ever signed himself. He was succeeded by his assistants Johann Friedrich Eberlein and Peter Reinecke.

After forty years work at the manufactury, he died at Meissen on 18 May 1775.

Collections
Examples of the thousands of pieces modelled by Kändler can be seen in most major museums collecting ceramics.  The best UK collection is on the sixth floor of the Victoria and Albert Museum, London. Other museums containing Kändler's work include the Birmingham Museum of Art, the Getty Museum, the National Gallery of Art, and the Rijksmuseum. In Germany you can find his sculptures in the Bavarian National Museum and the Dresden Porcelain Collection at Zwinger Palace.

Gallery

References

Biographical information from the Getty Museum
"Kändler, Johann Joachim." The Grove Encyclopedia of Decorative Arts. Volume 2. Oxford University Press, 2006. pg. 535-536

1706 births
1775 deaths
German potters
18th-century German sculptors
18th-century German male artists
German male sculptors
Court sculptors
German designers
Meissen porcelain